Validated numerics, or rigorous computation, verified computation, reliable computation, numerical verification is numerics including mathematically strict error (rounding error, truncation error, discretization error) evaluation, and it is one field of numerical analysis. For computation, interval arithmetic is used, and all results are represented by intervals. Validated numerics were used by Warwick Tucker in order to solve the 14th of Smale's problems, and today it is recognized as a powerful tool for the study of dynamical systems.

Importance
Computation without verification may cause unfortunate results. Below are some examples.

Rump's example
In the 1980s, Rump made an example. He made a complicated function and tried to obtain its value. Single precision, double precision, extended precision results seemed to be correct, but its plus-minus sign was different from the true value.

Phantom solution
Breuer–Plum–McKenna used the spectrum method to solve the boundary value problem of the Emden equation, and reported that an asymmetric solution was obtained. This result to the study conflicted to the theoretical study by Gidas–Ni–Nirenberg which claimed that there is no asymmetric solution. The solution obtained by Breuer–Plum–McKenna was a phantom solution caused by discretization error. This is a rare case, but it tells us that when we want to strictly discuss differential equations, numerical solutions must be verified.

Accidents caused by numerical errors
The following examples are known as accidents caused by numerical errors:
 Failure of intercepting missiles in the Gulf War (1991)
 Failure of the Ariane 5 rocket (1996)
 Mistakes in election result totalization

Main topics
The study of validated numerics is divided into the following fields:

Tools

See also

References

Further reading
 Tucker, Warwick (2011). Validated Numerics: A Short Introduction to Rigorous Computations. Princeton University Press.
 Moore, Ramon Edgar, Kearfott, R. Baker., Cloud, Michael J. (2009). Introduction to Interval Analysis. Society for Industrial and Applied Mathematics.
 Rump, Siegfried M. (2010). Verification methods: Rigorous results using floating-point arithmetic. Acta Numerica, 19, 287-449.

External links
 Validated Numerics for Pedestrians
 Reliable Computing, An open electronic journal devoted to numerical computations with guaranteed accuracy, bounding of ranges, mathematical proofs based on floating-point arithmetic, and other theory and applications of interval arithmetic and directed rounding.

Numerical analysis
Computational science